A list of notable film directors from Slovenia:

A 
 Karpo Ačimović Godina
 Vinci Vogue Anžlovar

B 
 Jože Babič
 Janez Burger

C 
 Jan Cvitkovič

Č 
 František Čap

D 
 Janez Drozg

G 
 Nejc Gazvoda

H 
 Boštjan Hladnik

K 
 Matjaž Klopčič
 Damjan Kozole

L 
 Janez Lapajne

M 
 Rene Maurin

P 
 Jože Pogačnik
 Igor Pretnar
 Metod Pevec

R 
 Filip Robar Dorin
 Franček Rudolf

S 
 Franci Slak
 Danijel Sraka

Š 
 France Štiglic

V 
 Goran Vojnović

 
Film
Slovenian